Judge Ackerman may refer to:

Harold A. Ackerman (1928–2009), judge of the United States District Court for the District of New Jersey
J. Waldo Ackerman (1926–1984), judge of the United States District Courts for the Southern and Central Districts of Illinois